Americo Joseph Valicenti (May 16, 1923 – January 10, 1995) was a Democratic member of the Pennsylvania House of Representatives.

References

Democratic Party members of the Pennsylvania House of Representatives
1995 deaths
1923 births
20th-century American politicians